Somtel is a telecommunications company headquartered in Hargeisa, Somaliland.

Regions
Somtel provides services in all over Somaliland.

Background
One of Somaliland's  leading telecommunications firms, it provides a comprehensive range of mobile voice and data services to customers, including Mobile Money Service and is a 3G and 4G services provider in Somaliland's network.

Somtel is largely owned by Dahabshiil, but is officially registered in the British Virgin Islands.

Services
 Free charge services
 Subscription services
 Internet service 
 Cloud
 Mobile Wallet

Partnerships

O3b
In November 2013, O3b Networks, Ltd. announced an agreement to provide high-speed, low-latency capacity to Somtel. The pact is expected to improve the firm's networks and reliability.

Google
Since 2012, Somtel has partnered with Google in e-mail services.

Frequency Band
Somtel operates on GSM and 4G LTE networks. 
3G 2100, 2G 1800, 900 and LTE 800MHz 20 FDD.

References

External links
Somtel

Telecommunications companies established in 2009
Telecommunications companies of Somaliland
Somalia